Albion High School may refer to:

Albion High School (Nebraska), Albion, Nebraska
Charles D'Amico High School, also known as Albion High School, Albion, New York
Albion High School (Michigan), Albion, Michigan
The Albion Academy, formerly Albion High School, Pendleton, Salford, Greater Manchester, England